= Ghulam Hassan Khan (Jammu and Kashmir politician) =

Indian politician (died 2026)

Ghulam Hassan Khan (died 2026) was an Indian politician from Jammu and Kashmir who served as a member of the Jammu and Kashmir Legislative Assembly and as a social welfare minister.

Khan died on 29 August 2026.
